Kwasi Boakye or Kwasi Boachi (24 April 1827 – 9 June 1904) was a Prince of the Ashanti Empire who was sent to the Netherlands together with his cousin, Kwame Poku, in 1837, by his father, King Kwaku Dua Panin, to receive education as part of larger negotiations between the Ashanti and the Dutch about the recruitment of Ashanti soldiers for the Dutch East Indies Army.

Early life 
He was the son of Kwaku Dua I who was the eighth King of the Ashanti Empire. During the era of the slave trade and after, many people left Africa for the Americas and Europe. He was part of the people who left the shores of Africa to study, while others were forced out of the continent. There was an agreement that was signed between Kwaku Dua I and King William I, that Kwasi Boakye was to return with his cousin, Kwame Poku after they are done with their studies. Kwame Poku did return to the Dutch Gold Coast as planned, Boakye stayed in the Netherlands. He was trained as a mining engineer at the Delft Royal Academy, from which he graduated in 1847.

Career 
In July 1847, Boakye had lectures at the Freiberg Mining Academy (Technische Universitat Bergakademie) in Germany. During his studies he stayed with Caroline Geudtner at Petersstrasse.

Boakye was sent to the Dutch East Indies in 1850, where he found himself discriminated against by his superior, Cornelius de Groot van Embden, for which he received a financial compensation in 1857. He became a member and correspondent for the Dutch East Indies again in 1871. As part of the compensation, he was awarded an estate in Bantar Peteh, south of Buitenzorg. Boakye died on this estate in 1904. He was a member of the Association of Civil Engineers which was later changed to Association of Delft Engineers. He was appointed an honorary member in 1893.

Legacy 
Dutch writer Arthur Japin has written a historical fiction novel based on the Boakye brothers' lives, The Two Hearts of Kwasi Boachi, released in 1997.

References

Footnotes

Bibliography

External links 

 
 

19th-century Dutch East Indies people
20th-century Dutch East Indies people
1827 births
1904 deaths
Ashanti royalty
Delft University of Technology alumni
Dutch Gold Coast people
Dutch mining engineers
Dutch people of Akan descent
Dutch people of Ghanaian descent
Freiberg University of Mining and Technology alumni
Ghanaian emigrants to the Netherlands
People from Kumasi